Jax and the Hellhound is a limited series comic book by Dennis Morales Francis and published by Blackthorne Publishing.

The series was about a young man who traveled around the world helping the U.S. Government fight the bad guys and helping a canine demon keep the really bad creatures from entering our dimension. The combination of 1980's futility of the war on drugs mirrored the fantasy aspects of the policing of inter-dimensional space.

Plot
Jacob (Jax) Marosco is mentored by Mulu a Dimensional Occult Guardian. The three issue storyline centered on the demi-god Jareda who wished to attempt a resurrection in our dimension. Jax and Mulu are committed to stopping him at any cost; including their lives.

The début of Jax and Mulu online. Cover art by Dennis Francis.
The story covered the war on drugs, mysticism, and a romantic relationship with an older woman. Jax and the Hellhound was part of Blackthorne Publishing’s pro black and white lineup. The 1980s produced the black and white comic craze that fired up the imaginations of kids and grownups alike. Unfortunately greed and over-speculation took its toll on the comic book market by the 1990s and many indie publishers went out of business. The black and white comic book market never returned to the level of popularity seen in the mid-1980s.

Dennis Morales Francis also co created the critically acclaimed Street Wolf along with Mark-Wayne Harris. He also penciled XL, Locke, Major Lancer and the Starlight Squadron and other books for DC Comics, Blackthorne Publishing, Eclipse Comics and other publishers.

The Jax and the Hellhound series has been resurrected by Dennis Morales Francis as a full color graphic novel series and can be previewed online at www.graphic-novels.com as well as [www.drunkduck.com].